Wanaro N'Godrella (18 October 1949 – 26 May 2016) was a French tennis player who was active in the late 1960s and the 1970s. His best performance at a Grand Slam tournament was reaching the quarterfinals of the singles' event at the 1973 Australian Open in which he was defeated by Karl Meiler in four sets. In 1973 and 1974 he played a doubles match for the French Davis Cup team.

He reached the highest singles ranking of No. 71 in October 1973.

N'Godrella reached the second round of the singles' event at the Wimbledon Championships in 1972. In 1973 he defeated fifth-seeded Manuel Orantes in the second round of the singles event at the French Open.

The center court at the ATP Challenger Tour event in his hometown of Nouméa is named for N'Godrella.

Career finals

Doubles (1 runner-up)

References

External links
 
 
 

French male tennis players
New Caledonian male tennis players
1949 births
2016 deaths
People from Nouméa